The Third Working Cabinet,, was an Indonesian
cabinet that resulted from a 6 March 1962 reshuffle of the previous cabinet by President Sukarno. It consisted of a prime minister, two first deputy ministers, eight deputy prime ministers and 36 ministers as well as 13 members who headed government bodies. It was dissolved on 13 November 1963.

Composition

Cabinet Leadership
Prime Minister: Sukarno
First Minister: Djuanda Kartawidjaja
First Deputy First Minister: Johannes Leimena
Second Deputy First Minister: Subandrio

Foreign Affairs/Overseas Economic Relations
Deputy Prime Minister/Coordinating Minister: Subandrio

Home Affairs
Deputy Prime Minister/Coordinating Minister: Sahardjo
Minister of General Government and Regional Autonomy: Ipik Gandamana
Minister of Justice: Sahardjo
Minister/Chairman of the Supreme Court: Wirjono Prodjodikoro

Defense and Security
Deputy Prime Minister/Coordinating Minister: Gen. Abdul Haris Nasution
Minister/Chief-of-Staff of the Army: Abdul Haris Nasution
Minister/Chief-of-Staff of the Navy: Commodore R. E. Martadinata
Minister/Chief-of-Staff of the Air Force: Air Vice Marshal Omar Dani
Minister/Chief of the National Police: Insp. Gen. Soekarno Djojonegoro
Minister/Attorney General: Kadarusman
Minister of Veteran Affairs: Brig. Gen. Sambas Atmadinata
Minister assigned to the Deputy Prime Minister of Defense and Security: Lt. Gen. Hidajat

Production
Deputy Prime Minister/Coordinating Minister: Maj. Gen. Suprajogi
Minister of Agriculture/Agrarian Affairs: Sadjarwo
Minister of Labor: Ahem Erningpradja
Minister of Public Works and Power: Maj. Gen. Suprajogi
Minister of Basic Industries and Mining: Chairul Saleh
Minister of People's Industry: Maj. Gen. Azis Saleh
Minister of National Research: Sudjono Djuned Pusponegoro

Distribution
Deputy Prime Minister/Coordinating Minister: Johannes Leimena
Minister of Trade: Suharto 
Minister of Land Transportation and Post, Telecommunications and Tourism: Lt. Gen. Djatikoesoemo
Minister of Maritime Transportation: Abdul Mutalib Danuningrat
Minister of Air Transportation: Col. R. Iskander
Minister of Cooperatives: Achmadi

Finance
Deputy Prime Minister/Coordinating Minister: Notohamiprodjo
Minister of Income, Payment and Oversight: Notohamiprodjo
Minister of State Budget Affairs: Arifin Harahap
Minister of Central Bank Affairs: Sumarno

Welfare
Deputy Prime Minister/Coordinating Minister: Muljadi Djojomartono
Minister of Religious Affairs: Sjaifuddin Zuchri
Minister of Social Affairs: Rusiah Sardjono
Minister of Health: Maj. Gen. Dr. Satrio
Minister of Basic Education & Culture: Prijono
Minister of Higher Education & Science: Thojib Hadiwidjaja
Minister of Sport: Maladi

Special Affairs
Deputy Prime Minister/Coordinating Minister: Muhammad Yamin
Minister of Information: Muhammad Yamin
Minister of Relations with the People's Representative Council/People's Consultative Assembly/Supreme Advisory Council/National Planning Agency: W. J. Rumambi
Minister of Relations with Religious Scholars: Fatah Jasin
Minister/Secretary General of the National Front: Sudibjo

Leaders of State Bodies/Deputy First Ministers
Chairman of the Provisional People's Consultative Assembly: Chairul Saleh
Speaker of the Mutual Assistance People's Representative Council: Zainul Arifin
Deputy Chairman of the Supreme Advisory Council: Sartono
Deputy Chairman of the National Planning Agency: Muhammad Yamin

Leaders of State Bodies/Ministers
Vice Chairman of the Provisional People's Consultative Assembly: Ali Sastroamidjojo
Deputy Chairman of the Provisional People's Consultative Assembly: Idham Chalid
Deputy Chairman of the Provisional People's Consultative Assembly: Dipa Nusantara Aidit
Deputy Chairman of the Provisional People's Consultative Assembly: Brig. Gen. Wilujo Puspojudo
Deputy Speaker of the Mutual Assistance People's Representative Council: Arudji Kartawinata
Deputy Speaker of the Mutual Assistance People's Representative Council: IGG Subamia
Deputy Speaker of the Mutual Assistance People's Representative Council: M. H. Lukman
Deputy Speaker of the Mutual Assistance People's Representative Council: Mursalin Daeng Mamangung

Minister assigned to the President
State Minister: Iwa Kusumasumantri

Official with ministerial rank
Chairman of the State Apparatus Oversight Board: Sultan Hamengkubuwono IX

Changes
On 12 April 1962, the State Apparatus Oversight Board was abolished by presidential degree and Sultan Hamengkubuwono IX left the cabinet.
On 4 May 1962, Johannes Leimena and Subandrio were appointed First and Second Deputy Prime minister respectively, with effect from 6 March.
On 21 June 1962, Ahmad Yani replaced Nasution as Army Chief of Staff. Nasution was appointed Deputy First Minister/Chief of Staff of the Indonesian National Armed Forces.
On 23 August 1962, Mohammad Ichsan and Abdul Wahab Surjoadiningrat were both appointed Minister/State Secretary
Following the death of Muhammad Yamin, Ruslan Abdulgani was appointed Deputy Prime Minister/Coordinating Minister/Minister of Information on 24 October 1962.
From 30 January 1963, chiefs-of-staff were retitled commanders of the respective armed forces*  branches.
Following the death of Mutual Assistance People's Representative Council Chairman Zainal Arifin, he was replaced by Deputy Chairman Arudji Kartawinata on 4 March 1963, who in turn was replaced by Achmad Sjaichu on 3 September.
On 11 April 1963, Minister Hidajat was appointed Minister of Land Transportation and Post, Telecommunications and Tourism, replacing Lt. Gen. Djatikusumo, who was appointed extraordinary ambassador for the Malaya land dispute.
Prime Minister Djuanda died on 7 November 1963. He was not replaced.

References
 

Cabinets of Indonesia
1962 establishments in Indonesia
1963 disestablishments in Indonesia
Cabinets established in 1962
Cabinets disestablished in 1963